The eighth edition of the Caribbean Series (Serie del Caribe) was played in 1956. It was held from February 10 through February 15, featuring the champion baseball teams of Cuba, Elefantes de Cienfuegos; Panama, Chesterfield Smokers; Puerto Rico, Criollos de Caguas and Venezuela, Industriales de Valencia. The format consisted of 12 games, each team facing the other teams twice. The games were played at Estadio Olímpico de Panamá in Panama City, Panama.

Summary
In this edition, Cienfuegos won the first of five consecutive Series titles for the Cuban team. Cienfuegos was managed by Oscar Rodríguez and finished with a 5-1 record. The pitching staff was guided by Camilo Pascual (2-0, 11 strikeouts, 2.50 ERA), Pedro Ramos (2-0, 1.59 ERA) and René Gutiérrez (1-0, 0.00 ERA in  innings). The offense was clearly led by catcher and Series MVP Ray Noble (.400 BA, one home run, .654 OBP and 1B Bob Boyd (.304 BA, one HR, 11 RBI, .522 SLG). Other contributions came from 2B Curt Roberts (.375, one HR, six runs, .542 SLG), Chico Fernández (.269, 10 runs, one HR) and 3B Milt Smith (two HR, .522 SLG). The roster also included IF Ossie Alvarez, OFs Prentice Browne and Archie Wilson and Ps Sandalio Consuegra, Seth Morehead and Gene Bearden, among others.

Panama, with Standford Graham at the helm, posted a 3-3 record to tie Puerto Rico for second place. Ps Don Elston, Ross Grimsley and Wally Burnette got the victories while 1B Elías Osorio (.286, 3 HR, .762 SLG) led the offense. Grimsley made the All-Star team, as well as OFs Bobby Prescott and Bill Stewart. The line up was also filled with Héctor López (2B), Humberto Robinson (P), David Roberts (OF) and Joe Tuminelli (3B).

Puerto Rico was managed by Ben Geraghty and got wins from Taylor Phillips, Roberto Vargas and Chi-Chi Olivo, while 1B Lou Limmer (.350, three HR, six runs, eight RBI) provided punch in the lineup. Also in the roster were Ps Tom Lasorda and Paul Stuffel, and Cs Bill Cash and Ray Murray; IFs Daryl Spencer (2B), Víctor Pellot Power (3B) and Félix Mantilla (SS), as well as OFs Wes Covington and Chuck Harmon.
 
Venezuela was managed by Regino Otero and finished in last place with a 1-5 mark. The team was outscored by their opponents 47-14. Bright spots were Ps Turk Farrell and Jim Pearce. Farrell recorded the lone win against Puerto Rico in a one-run, one hit  effort, while Pearce took an 11-inning, 2-1 loss to Panama, striking out nine batters without giving a walk. Valencia also featured Ed Bailey (C), Tommy Brown (1B), Elio Chacón (CF), Emilio Cueche (P), Julián Ladera (P) and Ron Mrozinski (P).

Final standings

Scoreboards

Game 1, February 10

Game 2, February 10

Game 3, February 11

Game 4, February 11

Game 5, February 12

Game 6, February 12

Game 7, February 13

Game 8, February 13

Game 9, February 14

Game 10, February 14

Game 11, February 15

Game 12, February 15

See also
Ballplayers who have played in the Series

Sources
Antero Núñez, José. Series del Caribe. Jefferson, Caracas, Venezuela: Impresos Urbina, C.A., 1987.
Gutiérrez, Daniel. Enciclopedia del Béisbol en Venezuela – 1895–2006 . Caracas, Venezuela: Impresión Arte, C.A., 2007.

External links
Official site
Latino Baseball
Series del Caribe, Las (Spanish)
 
  
 

Caribbean
Caribbean Series
International baseball competitions hosted by Panama
1956 in Panama
1956 in Caribbean sport
Sports competitions in Panama City
Caribbean Series
20th century in Panama City